The first representative from the United States to Denmark was appointed in 1827 as a Chargé d'Affaires. There followed a series of chargés and ministers until 1890 when the first full ambassador (Envoy Extraordinary and Minister Plenipotentiary) was appointed. The title was changed to Ambassador Extraordinary and Plenipotentiary in 1946. The Ambassador's offices are housed within the Embassy of the United States, Copenhagen.

List of ambassadors

Chargé d'Affaires (1827–1854)

Minister Resident (1854–1876)

Chargé d'Affaires (1876–1882)

Minister Resident/Consul General (1882–1890)

Envoy Extraordinary and Minister Plenipotentiary (1890–1947)

Ambassador Extraordinary and Plenipotentiary (1947–)

Notes

See also
Denmark–United States relations
Foreign relations of Denmark
Ambassadors of the United States

References
United States Department of State: Background notes on Denmark

External links
 United States Department of State: Chiefs of Mission for Denmark
 United States Department of State: Denmark
 United States Embassy in Copenhagen

 
Denmark
Lists of ambassadors to Denmark